Pollienus Auspex (fl. 3rd century AD) was a Roman military officer and senator who was appointed suffect consul around AD 185. His praenomen is thought to be Tiberius.

Biography
Pollienus Auspex was a member of the possibly Italian gens Pollieni, and the son of Pollienus Auspex. He reached the office of suffect consul sometime before AD 193, most likely around AD 185. However, from this point on, dates are obscure, and his career has been dated from anywhere from the reign of Commodus to that of Alexander Severus.

His next appointment was probably as Iudex ex delegatione Caesarum or Vice Augg cognoscens (the judicial deputy of the emperor in Rome), which he held either before 192, or between 197 and 202, or around 218–9. Auspex also held a number of provincial commands around this time: Legatus Augusti pro praetore of Hispania Tarraconensis (between 186 and 189, or 193–197, or 222–235), Dacia (between 190 and 192, or 193–197, or 222–235), Moesia Inferior (between 193 and 197, or 222–235) and Britannia (if held between 193 and 197) or Britannia Superior (if held around AD 230).

Although traditionally described as being Pollienus Auspex's biological son, Tiberius Julius Pollienus Auspex has also been identified by some scholars as being the same individual as this Pollienus Auspex. If his career was dated to the reign of Alexander Severus, then Pollienus Auspex was also probably the adoptive father of Tiberius Pollienus Armenius Peregrinus.

Footnotes

Sources
 Mennen, Inge, Power and Status in the Roman Empire, AD 193-284 (2011)

References

3rd-century Romans
Auspex
Suffect consuls of Imperial Rome
Roman governors of Britain
Roman governors of Dacia
Roman governors of Hispania Tarraconensis
Roman governors of Lower Moesia
Year of birth unknown
Year of death unknown